Ibn Hammad is an Arabic patronymic, carried by:
Qaid ibn Hammad (d. 1054)
Ismail ibn Hammad al-Jawhari (d. 1002/8)
Ibn Hammad (historian) (d. 1230), author of a Fatimid history

See also
Hammadid